|}

This is a list of electoral division results for the Northern Territory 1990 General Election in Australia.

Results by electoral division

Arafura

Araluen

Arnhem

Barkly

Braitling

Brennan

Casuarina

Fannie Bay

Goyder

Greatorex

Jingili

Karama

Katherine

Leanyer

MacDonnell

Millner

Nelson

Nhulunbuy

Nightcliff

Palmerston

Port Darwin

Sanderson

Stuart

Victoria River

Wanguri

See also 

 1990 Northern Territory general election
 Members of the Northern Territory Legislative Assembly, 1990–1994

References 

Results of Northern Territory elections